Orazio Falconieri (died 1664) was an Italian nobleman from Florence; he was the owner of the Villa Falconieri. His heraldic symbol was a falcon.

Family

Falconieri was the son of Paolo Falconieri and Maddalena Albizzi and the brother of Lelio Falconieri who was later elevated to Cardinal.

In 1615 he married Ottavia Sacchetti (1590–1645), sister of Cardinal Giulio Cesare Sacchetti who would later consecrate Orazio's brother Lelio. The Sacchetti and Falconieri were already close; Orazio's father had made his fortune importing salt and as a result Orazio had business connections to Ottavia Sacchetti's father. When Ottavia's first husband, Piero Alberti, died, marriage to Orazio was considered an excellent option for both families. Records indicate they had at least one son (Paolo Francesco Falconieri) who took ownership of the Villa Falconieri and took his father's titles.

Commissions

Falconieri purchased the Villa Falconieri and commissioned Francesco Borromini to renovate it. Orazio later commissioned Borromini to renovate the church of San Giovanni dei Fiorentini to build a Falconieri family chapel for his burial and the burial of his brother Lelio Falconieri.

References 

1664 deaths
Italian untitled nobility
Nobility from Florence
Year of birth unknown